Señorita Pólvora is a television series produced by Teleset for Sony Pictures Television and Televisa, which will be broadcast in the Latin American by TNT. It is the story of a Beauty Queen, who gets involved in a hit, which leads to the premature death of her father.

 Episodes 

 References 

 External links 

Lists of American drama television series episodes